Novino is a rural locality (a village) in Razdolyevskoye Rural Settlement, Kolchuginsky District, Vladimir Oblast, Russia. The population was 1 as of 2010.

Geography 
Novino is located 110 km southeast of Kolchugino (the district's administrative centre) by road. Demlevo is the nearest rural locality.

References 

Rural localities in Kolchuginsky District